Cerithiopsis alabastrula is a species of very small sea snail, a marine gastropod mollusk in the family Cerithiopsidae. This species was described by Otto Andreas Lowson Mörch in 1876.

References

alabastrula
Gastropods described in 1876